An Yeong-han (born 27 November 1917) was a South Korean athlete. He competed in the men's discus throw at the 1948 Summer Olympics.

References

External links
 

1917 births
Possibly living people
Athletes (track and field) at the 1948 Summer Olympics
South Korean male discus throwers
Olympic athletes of South Korea
Place of birth missing